Hamburg is an unincorporated community in Bond County, Illinois, United States. Hamburg is south of Mulberry Grove and east-southeast of Greenville.

References

Unincorporated communities in Bond County, Illinois
Unincorporated communities in Illinois